Heliconia brenneri is a species of plant in the family Heliconiaceae. It is endemic to Ecuador.  Its natural habitat is subtropical or tropical moist montane forest. The expansion of the road passing through its range poses a potential threat.

References

Flora of Ecuador
brenneri
Vulnerable plants
Taxonomy articles created by Polbot